The canton of Sainte-Maxime is an administrative division of the Var department, southeastern France. It was created at the French canton reorganisation which came into effect in March 2015. Its seat is in Sainte-Maxime.

It consists of the following communes:

Cavalaire-sur-Mer
Cogolin
La Croix-Valmer
Gassin
Grimaud
La Môle
Le Plan-de-la-Tour
Ramatuelle
Saint-Tropez
Sainte-Maxime

References

Cantons of Var (department)